Alapakkam is a district of Chennai, India. 

Alapakkam may also refer to:

Places in Tamil Nadu, India 
 Alapakkam, Kancheepuram, a census town in Kancheepuram district 
 Alapakkam, Cuddalore, a panchayat village in Cuddalore district
 Alapakkam I, Uthukkottai, a panchayat village in Uthukkottai taluk, Tiruvallur district
 Alapakkam II, Uthukkottai, a village in Uthukkottai taluk, Tiruvallur district